Max Marcuse (April 14, 1877, BerlinJune 24, 1963, Tel Aviv) was a German dermatologist and sexologist.  He became an editor for Magnus Hirschfeld’s Journal of Sexology in 1919 and continued editing the journal until 1932. Marcuse immigrated to Palestine in 1933, following the Nazi rise to power. Several of Marcuse's unpublished writings are being preserved at the Kinsey Institute.

References

External links 
 Max Marcuse biography (Humboldt University of Berlin)

1877 births
1963 deaths
German dermatologists
German sexologists
Jewish dermatologists
Jewish emigrants from Nazi Germany to Mandatory Palestine
Physicians from Berlin